Georgia, winners of Junior Eurovision Song Contest 2008, competed in the Junior Eurovision Song Contest 2009, held in Kyiv, Ukraine. GPB held a national final to select the Georgian entry, chosen from 10 competing entries.

Before Junior Eurovision

National final
From the 500 applications sent into GPB, 10 acts were selected to compete in the national final, to be held in 26 September 2009. The 10 competing acts consisted of individual acts, along with specially-formed groups created by GPB from individual entries.

The ten acts also took part in a national tour, where, they performed in various towns around Georgia over a monthly period before the national final.

At Eurovision

Voting

Notes

References

External links 
  GPB website

Georgia (country)
Junior Eurovision Song Contest
2009